Cliff Hanger is an album by Jimmy Cliff, released in 1985 through CBS Records. In 1986, the album won Cliff the Grammy Award for Best Reggae Recording.

The album featured collaborations with members of Kool and the Gang and included two songs co-written by La Toya Jackson.

Track listing
All songs by Jimmy Cliff, unless noted otherwise#

 "Hitting with Music" – 4:15
 "American Sweet" (Bayyan, La Toya Jackson) –3:41
 "Arrival" – 4:07
 "Brown Eyes" (Bayyan, La Toya Jackson) –3:39
 "Reggae Street" – 3:29
 "Hot Shot" – 4:25
 "Sunrise" – 3:48
 "Dead and Awake" – 3:36
 "Now and Forever" – 4:55
 "Nuclear War" – 4:12

Personnel

 Jimmy Cliff – piano, vocals
 Jaco Pastorius – bass (on "Brown Eyes")
 Ansel Collins – organ
 La Toya Jackson -  writer, arranger
 Amir-Salaam Bayyan – synthesizer, guitar
 Ronald Bell – keyboards, tenor saxophone
 Harold Butler – keyboards
 Wilburn Cole – drums
 Peter Duarte – horn
 Sly Dunbar – drums
 Gary Henry – keyboards
 Christopher Meredith – bass
 Kim Palumu – guitar
 Michael Ray – trumpet
 Robbie Shakespeare – bass
 Earl "Chinna" Smith – guitar
 Kendal Stubbs – bass
 Dennis White – horn
 Curtis "Fitz" Williams – saxophone
 Sidney Wolfe – percussion
 Fernando Luis – guitar
 Isidro Ross – percussion
 Rick Iantosca – guitar, keyboards
 Syd Judah – horn
 Cliff Adams – trombone
 Bertram "Ranchie" McLean – rhythm guitar

References

1985 albums
CBS Records albums
Grammy Award for Best Reggae Album
Jimmy Cliff albums